Fandon is an unincorporated community in Chalmers Township, McDonough County, Illinois, United States. The community is also known as Middletown. The nearest city to Fandon is Colchester. Fandon does not have its own post office and is part of Colchester's ZIP code.  Formerly, it had Zip Code 62335.

History
Fandon was established in 1837 by Major John Patrick and James Edmonston. It was originally called Middletown because it was the central point between Beardstown and Burlington. When citizens of McDonough County organized the Forgottonia secession movement in the 1970s, Fandon was named its capital.

How the States Got Their Shapes (2011)
In 2011, The History Channel series How the States Got Their Shapes focused part of its second episode to the historic inequality given to the Illinois region known as Forgottonia which was a region that considered seceding from the rest of Illinois and establishing its capital at Fandon.

References

Unincorporated communities in McDonough County, Illinois
Unincorporated communities in Illinois
Populated places established in 1837